In software engineering, the data mapper pattern is an architectural pattern. It was named by Martin Fowler in his 2003 book Patterns of Enterprise Application Architecture. The interface of an object conforming to this pattern would include functions such as Create, Read, Update, and Delete, that operate on objects that represent domain entity types in a data store.

A Data Mapper is a Data Access Layer that performs bidirectional transfer of data between a persistent data store (often a relational database) and an in-memory data representation (the domain layer). The goal of the pattern is to keep the in-memory representation and the persistent data store independent of each other and the data mapper itself. This is useful when one needs to model and enforce strict business processes on the data in the domain layer that do not map neatly to the persistent data store. The layer is composed of one or more mappers (or Data Access Objects), performing the data transfer. Mapper implementations vary in scope. Generic mappers will handle many different domain entity types, dedicated mappers will handle one or a few.

Implementations 
Implementations of the concept can be found in various frameworks for many programming environments.

Java/.NET 
 MyBatis persistence framework
 Hibernate (NHibernate) persistence framework

Node.js / TypeScript 
 Bookshelf.js library
 TypeORM library
 Massive.js library
 Prisma
 Objection.js library
 MikroORM library

PHP 
 Atlas ORM (data mapper, table data gateway, query builder, and PDO wrapper)
 Doctrine2 Object Relational Mapper (ORM) and the Database Abstraction Layer
 Cycle ORM (PHP DataMapper ORM and Data Modelling Engine)

Perl 
DBIx

Python 
 SQLAlchemy library
 mincePy library

Ruby 
 DataMapper  library (Actually this library implemented the Active Record design pattern, its successor, DataMapper 2 (now ROM) aimed to actually implement the design pattern it was named after)

Elixir 
 Ecto persistence framework

See also

References 

Software design patterns
Architectural pattern (computer science)